Carl Josef Ternström (4 December 1888 – 2 May 1953) was a Swedish runner. He competed at the 1912 Summer Olympics in cross country events and won a team gold medal, finishing fifth individually. The course was rather hilly and approximately 12 km long; it was not made known to competitors before the race.

References

1888 births
1953 deaths
Swedish male long-distance runners
Olympic athletes of Sweden
Athletes (track and field) at the 1912 Summer Olympics
Olympic gold medalists for Sweden
Medalists at the 1912 Summer Olympics
Olympic gold medalists in athletics (track and field)
Olympic cross country runners
People from Gävle
Sportspeople from Gävleborg County